Tingi is an administrative ward in Kilwa District of Lindi Region in Tanzania. 
According to the 2012 census, the ward has a total population of 6,782. The ward seat is Njianne village.

References

Wards of Kilwa District
Wards of Lindi Region